Birch Beach is an unincorporated community approximately 15 miles north of Williams, Lake of the Woods County, Minnesota, United States. It lies along the southern shore of Lake of the Woods, southeast of Long Point.

County Road 52, also known as Birch Beach Drive, leads to the community, which consists of a series of roughly 60 houses and cabins along the road.

References

Further reading
 Minnesota DOT map of Lake of the Woods County (2008)

Unincorporated communities in Lake of the Woods County, Minnesota
Unincorporated communities in Minnesota